Secretary of the Central Commission for Discipline Inspection of the Communist Party of China is the head of the Central Commission for Discipline Inspection. The Secretary is a very important political position, serving as one of the top leaders of the Chinese Communist Party (CCP).

The office holders have always been a member of the CCP Politburo or the Politburo Standing Committee which are the de facto highest and powerful decision-making bodies in People's Republic of China. The current secretary is Li Xi.

List of secretaries